The 2016 Canada Sevens is the first edition of the Canada Sevens tournament, and the sixth tournament of the 2015–16 World Rugby Sevens Series. The tournament was played on 12–13 March 2016 at BC Place in Vancouver, BC.

Format
Sixteen teams are drawn into four pools of four teams each. Each team plays each of the other teams their pool once. The top two teams from each pool advance to the Cup/Plate brackets. The bottom two teams from each group go to the Bowl/Shield brackets.

Teams
The 16 participating teams for the tournament:

Pool stages

Pool A

Pool B

Pool C

Pool D

Knockout stage

Shield

Bowl

Plate

Cup

References

External links
 World Rugby Sevens Series website

Canada Sevens
Canada Sevens
Canada Sevens
2016 in British Columbia